Helvio Nicolás Guozden (2 January 1914 – 19 July 1983) was an Argentine politician who served as the de facto Federal Interventor of Córdoba from March 22, 1971 to May 25, 1973.

References

1914 births
1983 deaths
Governors of Córdoba Province, Argentina
People from Buenos Aires